Fred Thackeray (1877–unknown) was an English footballer who played in the Football League for Gainsborough Trinity and The Wednesday.

References

1877 births
English footballers
Association football defenders
English Football League players
Sheffield Wednesday F.C. players
Gainsborough Trinity F.C. players
Rotherham County F.C. players
Eccles United F.C. players
Year of death missing